Kilakurichy  is a village in Tiruchirappalli taluk of Tiruchirappalli district in Tamil Nadu, India.

Demographics 

As per the 2001 census, Kilakurichy had a population of 6,536 with 3,232 males and 3,304 females. The sex ratio was 1022 and the literacy rate, 88.42.

References 

 

Villages in Tiruchirappalli district